Carl Dean Switzer (August 7, 1927 – January 21, 1959) was an American singer, child actor, dog breeder, and guide. He was best known for his role as Alfalfa in the short subjects series Our Gang.

Switzer began his career as a child actor in the mid-1930s appearing in the Our Gang short subjects series as Alfalfa, one of the series' most popular and best-remembered characters. After leaving the series in 1940, Switzer struggled to find substantial roles owing to typecasting. As an adult, he appeared mainly in bit parts and B-movies. He later became a dog breeder and hunting guide.

Switzer married in 1954 and had one son before divorcing his wife in 1957. He was fatally shot by an acquaintance in a dispute over money in January 1959.

Early life and family
Switzer was born in Paris, Illinois, the youngest of four children born to Gladys Carrie Shanks (1904–1997) and George Frederick "Fred" Switzer (1905–1960). The oldest brother died in 1922. A sister Janice was born in 1923 and a brother Harold was born in 1925. He was named Carl Dean after a member of the Switzer family and many relatives on his grandmother's side (respectively). He and his brother Harold became famous in their hometown for their musical talent and performances. Both sang and could play a number of instruments.

Career

Our Gang

In 1934, the Switzers traveled to California to visit family. While sightseeing, they went to Hal Roach Studios. Following a public tour, 8-year-old Harold and 6-year-old Carl entered the Hal Roach Studio's open-to-the-public cafeteria, the Our Gang Café, and began an impromptu performance. Producer Hal Roach was present and was impressed. He signed both brothers to appear in Our Gang. Harold was given two nicknames, "Slim" and "Deadpan", while Carl was dubbed "Alfalfa".

The brothers first appeared in the 1935 Our Gang short Beginner's Luck. By the end of the year, Alfalfa was one of the main characters, while Harold had been relegated to the background. Although Carl was an experienced singer and musician, his character Alfalfa was often called upon to sing off-key renditions of popular songs for comic effect, most often those of Bing Crosby. Alfalfa also sported a cowlick.

By the end of 1937, Switzer's "Alfalfa" had surpassed the series' nominal star, George "Spanky" McFarland, in popularity. While the boys got along, their fathers argued constantly over their sons' screen time and salaries. Switzer's best friend among the Our Gang actors was Tommy Bond, who played his on-screen nemesis "Butch". In Bond's words, he and Switzer became good friends because "neither of us could replace the others".

Adult years
Switzer's tenure on Our Gang ended in 1940, when he was twelve. His first role after leaving the series was as a Boy Scout in I Love You Again (1940) starring William Powell and Myrna Loy. He then co-starred in the 1941 comedy Reg'lar Fellers. The next year, he had a supporting role in Mrs. Wiggs of the Cabbage Patch. Switzer continued to appear in films in various supporting roles, including in Johnny Doughboy (1942), Going My Way (1944), and The Great Mike (1944).

Switzer had an uncredited role as Auggie in the 1943 film The Human Comedy. Switzer's last starring roles were in a brief series of imitation Bowery Boys films. He reprised his "Alfalfa" character, complete with comically sour vocals, in PRC's Gas House Kids comedies in 1946 and 1947. By this time Switzer was downplaying his earlier Our Gang work. In his 1946 resume, he referred to the films generically as "M-G-M short product".

Switzer had small parts in both the 1946 Christmas film It's a Wonderful Life as Mary Hatch's (Donna Reed) date at a high school dance in the film's beginning and again in the 1948 film On Our Merry Way as the mayor's son, a trumpet player in a fixed musical talent contest. In 1952, he played a busboy in the film Pat and Mike starring Spencer Tracy and Katharine Hepburn. In the 1954 musical film White Christmas, his photo was used to depict "Freckle-Faced Haynes, the Dog-Faced Boy", an army buddy of lead characters Wallace and Davis (played by Bing Crosby and Danny Kaye) who was also the brother of the female leads the Haynes Sisters, played by Rosemary Clooney and Vera-Ellen.

In the 1950s, Switzer turned to television. Between 1952 and 1955, he made six appearances on The Roy Rogers Show. He also guest-starred in an episode of the American science fiction anthology series Science Fiction Theatre and The George Burns and Gracie Allen Show. In 1953 and 1954, Switzer co-starred in three William A. Wellman-directed films: Island in the Sky and The High and the Mighty, both starring John Wayne, and Track of the Cat, starring Robert Mitchum. In 1956, he co-starred in The Bowery Boys film Dig That Uranium followed by a bit part as a Hebrew slave in Cecil B. DeMille's The Ten Commandments. Switzer's final film role was in the 1958 drama The Defiant Ones.

Besides acting, Switzer bred and trained hunting dogs and guided hunting expeditions. Among his notable clients were Roy Rogers and Dale Evans (Switzer's son's godparents), James Stewart, and Henry Fonda.

Personal life
In early 1954, Switzer went on a blind date with Diantha Collingwood (1930–2004), also known as Dian or Diana. She was the daughter of Lelo and Faye Collingwood, and a heiress to the grain elevator empire Collingwood Grain. Collingwood had moved with her mother and sister to California in 1953 because her sister wanted to become an actress. Switzer and Collingwood got along well and married in Las Vegas three months later.

In 1956, with his money running out and Diantha pregnant, his mother-in-law offered them a farm near Pretty Prairie, Kansas. Their son, Justin Lance Collingwood Switzer (later Justin Lance Collingwood Elridge) was born that year. They divorced in 1957. Diantha married Richard Rosswell "Ross" Elridge (1933–2007), who adopted and raised Lance as his own, and had two other children by him, sons Chris and Lee Elridge.

In 1987, former Our Gang co-star George "Spanky" McFarland recalled a meeting with Switzer when they spoke about the farm:

In January 1958, Switzer was getting into his car in front of a bar in Studio City, when a bullet smashed through the window and struck him in the upper right arm. The gunman was never caught. Later that December, Switzer was arrested in Sequoia National Forest for cutting down 15 pine trees he had intended to illegally sell as Christmas trees. He was sentenced to one year's probation. Switzer was ordered to pay a $225 fine (more than $ today).

Death

In the midst of his legal and financial woes, Switzer agreed to train a hunting dog, a Treeing Walker Coonhound, for Moses Samuel "Bud" Stiltz. Stiltz was a longtime friend and sometime business partner, whom Switzer had met while working with Roy Rogers on various productions at the Corriganville Movie Ranch. While in Switzer's possession, the dog ran off, to chase after a bear. Stiltz was unsympathetic towards Switzer, firm in his demands that the former child star must either return his dog or pay him the equivalent of the dog's value. 

Unable to produce cash to settle the debt, Switzer took out ads in newspapers and put up fliers, offering a reward for the safe return of the animal. Eventually, the dog was located and brought to the bar where Switzer was working at the time. The rescuer was rewarded with $35 in cash and $15 in alcoholic beverages, the equivalent of about $450 in 2020. The loss of his $50 did not sit well with Switzer. During an emotional conversation with his friend Jack Piott, a 37-year-old unit still photographer, that took place a few days later, the two decided that Stiltz should reimburse Switzer the finder's fee. Their argument was that the dog was Stiltz's and not Switzer's. 

The two arrived at Stiltz's home in Mission Hills, at 10400 Columbus Avenue. Stiltz shared the home with his wife, Rita Corrigan, and his stepchildren. Switzer and Piott intended to demand money from Stiltz. Though differing accounts of the event exist, all agree that Stiltz was struck over the left side of his head with a glass clock. He later retreated to his room to retrieve a .38-caliber revolver, which Switzer wrestled him for. Their struggle caused the gun to discharge and almost shoot Tom Corrigan, Stiltz's 14-year-old stepson.

Stiltz's account of the event was one of self-defense, testifying that Switzer had banged on his front door, yelling "Let me in, or I'll kick in the door." The threat was followed by a struggle that began with one of the men, Switzer or Piott, striking Stiltz with the clock. This prompted Stiltz to retrieve his firearm, which Switzer grabbed for. The gun discharged accidentally, almost shooting Corrigan. Switzer then, according to Stiltz, threatened him with a knife and yelled, "I'm going to kill you!" Stiltz fired and shot Switzer in the groin, damaging an artery that caused massive internal bleeding. Switzer was dead when he arrived at the hospital.

Tom Corrigan's account differed significantly from his stepfather's. He told investigators that Stiltz shot Switzer as he and Piott were leaving. After the gun's accidental discharge that almost hit Corrigan, Switzer turned to Piott and said they needed to leave. The two were headed for the door when Stiltz then fired the fatal shot. Switzer never drew a knife, as Stiltz had claimed he had.

Corrigan was never called to testify at the coroner's inquest, and Stiltz testified in his own favor. His testimony was taken to be truthful, despite physical evidence that contradicted his account and his past perjury conviction. Years later, Corrigan stood by what he told officers had happened that night, and said his stepfather did not have to kill Switzer.

Later account
The shooting was judged to be self-defense. During the inquest regarding Switzer's death, it was revealed that what was reported as a "hunting knife" was in fact a penknife. It had been found by crime scene investigators under his body.

Over 42 years later, in January 2001, a third witness came forward and gave his version. Tom Corrigan, the son of Western movie star Ray "Crash" Corrigan and stepson of Moses Stiltz, was a child who was present the night Switzer was killed. "It was more like murder," Corrigan told reporters. He said he heard the knock on the front door, and Switzer said "Western Union for Bud Stiltz." Corrigan's mother, Rita Corrigan, opened the door to find a drunk Switzer, complaining about a perceived month-old debt and demanding repayment. Corrigan said Switzer entered the house first, followed by Jack Piott. Switzer said he was going to beat up Stiltz, and Stiltz confronted Switzer with a .38-caliber revolver in his hand. 

Corrigan said that Switzer grabbed the revolver and Stiltz and Switzer struggled over it. He said Piott broke a glass-domed clock over Stiltz's head, causing Stiltz's eye to swell shut. During the struggle, a shot was fired into the ceiling and Corrigan was struck in the leg by a fragment. Corrigan said his two younger sisters ran to a neighbor's house to call for help. "Well, we shot Tommy, enough of this," he said he recalled Switzer saying, just before Switzer and Piott started to leave the house.

Corrigan said he had just stepped out the front door when he heard, but did not witness, a second shot behind him. He said he then turned and saw Switzer sliding down the wall with a surprised look on his face after Stiltz had shot him. Corrigan said he saw a closed penknife at Switzer's side, which he presumed fell out of his pocket or his hand. He said he then saw his stepfather shove Piott against the kitchen counter and threaten to kill him too. Corrigan said they heard emergency sirens as Piott begged for his life, and that he thought this was the only reason Stiltz did not kill Piott. Corrigan said his stepfather lied in his account of the event before the coroner's jury.

Corrigan said a Los Angeles Police Department detective interviewed him and asked if he would testify before the judge. Corrigan said he agreed to, but he was never called before the court. "He didn't have to kill him," Corrigan said decades later.

Moses Stiltz died in 1983 at the age of 62.

Burial
Carl Switzer was interred at the Hollywood Forever Cemetery in Hollywood, California. Because he died the same day as Cecil B. DeMille, his death received only minor notice in most newspapers, as DeMille's obituary dominated the columns. Switzer had appeared as a slave (uncredited) in the last film for which DeMille was credited as a director, The Ten Commandments.

Switzer's gravestone features the square and compasses of Freemasonry and an image of a hunting dog, reflecting his dog-training hunting-guide interests at the time of his death.

Selected filmography

See also

References

Further reading
 Best, Marc. Those Endearing Young Charms: Child Performers of the Screen. South Brunswick and New York: Barnes & Co., 1971, pp. 245–250.
 Dye, David. Child and Youth Actors: Filmography of Their Entire Careers, 1914–1985. Jefferson, NC: McFarland & Co., 1988, pp. 223–225.
 Holmstrom, John. The Moving Picture Boy: An International Encyclopaedia from 1895 to 1995. Norwich, Michael Russell, 1996, pp. 145–146.

Documentary
 "The Life and Death of Carl "Alfalfa" Switzer," Grave Explorations, via YouTube, July 2, 2020.

External links

 
 
 
 Carl Switzer at The Crime Library

1927 births
1959 deaths
1959 murders in the United States
20th-century American male actors
20th-century American singers
American child singers
American male child actors
American male film actors
American male television actors
American people of German descent
American people of Scottish descent
Hal Roach Studios actors
Burials at Hollywood Forever Cemetery
Deaths by firearm in California
Male actors from Illinois
People from Paris, Illinois
People murdered in Los Angeles
Our Gang